6 Geminorum is a variable star in the zodiac constellation of Gemini, located roughly 5,800 light years away from the Sun. It has the variable star designation BU Geminorum; 6 Geminorum is the Flamsteed designation. At its brightest this reddish hued star is barely visible to the naked eye but is readily visible with binoculars, found southeast of M 35, just to the south of WY Geminorum. It is moving further from the Earth with a heliocentric radial velocity of +27 km/s. The star is a member of the Gemini OB1 association.

This is an evolved red supergiant with a stellar classification of M1-2 Ia-Iab. It is a semiregular variable star, ranging from visual magnitude +5.7 down to +7.5 over a period of 325 days. It has been given the sub-classification of Lc, which means "Irregular variable supergiants of late spectral types having amplitudes of about 1 mag. in V.O". The star has expanded to 821 times the Sun's radius and is radiating 86,000 times the luminosity of the Sun from its swollen photosphere at an effective temperature of 3,789 K.

References

M-type supergiants
Slow irregular variables
Gemini (constellation)
J06121911+2254305
BD+22 1220
Geminorum, 06
042543
029450
2197
IRAS catalogue objects
Geminorum, BU